The 2022–23 Vermont Catamounts women's ice hockey season will represent University of Vermont during the 2022–23 NCAA Division I women's ice hockey season.

Offseason

Recruiting

Departures

Regular season

Standings

Schedule 

|-
!colspan=12 style="  "| Regular Season
|-

|-
!colspan=12 style="  "| Hockey East Tournament
|-

Roster

Awards and honors 

 Corinne McCool named Hockey East Player of the Week (October 3, 2022).
 Corinne McCool named University of Vermont TD Bank Student-Athlete of the Week (October 5, 2022).
 Theresa Schafzahl sets program record with most points in program history (October 9, 2022).
 Theresa Schafzahl named University of Vermont TD Bank Student-Athlete of the Week (October 11, 2022).
 Lara Beecher named Hockey East Rookie of the Week (October 18, 2022).
 Natálie Mlýnková named University of Vermont TD Bank Student-Athlete of the Week (November 9, 2022).
 Natálie Mlýnková named Hockey East Player of the Month (Month of November).
 Ellice Murphy named Hockey East Defender of the Month (Month of November).
 Lara Beecher names Hockey East Rookie of the Month (Month of January).
 Theresa Schafzahl named University of Vermont TD Bank Student-Athlete of the Week (February 16, 2023).
 Lara Beecher named to Hockey East All-Rookie Team (February 22, 2023).
 Sini Karjalainen named Hockey East Defender of the Year (February 22, 2023).
 Sini Karjalainen named to Hockey East First Team All-Star (February 24, 2023).
 Theresa Schafzahl named to Hockey East First Team All-Star (February 24, 2023).
 Natálie Mlýnková named to Hockey East Third Team All-Star (February 24, 2023).
 Jessie McPherson named to Hockey East Third Team All-Star (February 24, 2023).
 Lara Beecher named Hockey East Rookie of the Year (March 1, 2023).

References

Vermont Catamounts
Vermont Catamounts women's ice hockey
Vermont Catamounts women's ice hockey
Vermont Catamounts women's ice hockey seasons